VA-81 or VA 81 may refer to:

 VFA-81, an aviation unit of the United States Navy
 Virginia State Route 81 (disambiguation)